Patrick D. Ryan (10 March 1920 – 2004) was Mayor of Galway, from 1962 to 1963. 

Ryan oversaw the visit of President of the United States, John F. Kennedy on 29 June 1963. Kennedy made one stop en route, to greet Ryan's 82-year-old mother, Catherine Morrison.

References
 Role of Honour:The Mayors of Galway City 1485-2001, William Henry, Galway 2001.

External links
Listing of previous Mayors of Galway
Profile of Patrick Ryan

Politicians from County Galway
1920 births
2004 deaths
Mayors of Galway